The José Saramago Foundation is a cultural private institution located in the Casa dos Bicos, in Lisbon (Portugal). A smaller branch has been opened in Azinhaga do Ribatejo, home village of José Saramago, the Portuguese Nobel Prize in Literature 1998. Founded by the writer in June 2007, its main institutional principles are to defend and spread the Universal Declaration of Human Rights, the promotion of culture in Portugal as well as in all the countries, and particular concerns about environmentalism.

The Casa dos Bicos, being the head office of this institution since June 2012, also offers, along with the permanent exhibition The seed and the fruits, about the life and work of José Saramago, cultural events such as books launching, theater plays, conferences, debates, poetry sessions, music concerts, among others.

The house where the writer and his wife Pilar del Río lived until his death in 2010, called just A Casa (The House), is also open to visitors in Tías, Lanzarote (Spain).

References

External links
 José Saramago Foundation official website
 A Casa José Saramago in Lanzarote

Foundations based in Portugal
Organisations based in Lisbon
Organizations established in 2007
Portuguese culture
Arts in Portugal
Portuguese literature
Libraries in Portugal
Culture in Lisbon
Museums in Lisbon
Tourist attractions in Lisbon
José Saramago